Ignazio Agliaudo (active 1737) was an Italian architect and veduta painter. His birth and death dates are not known.

Very little is known of Agliaudo's life. He was a Spaniard by birth, and was living in Turin in 1737. He is primarily known from surviving works documenting that he collaborated with other architects to produce decorations in celebration of the marriage between Charles Emmanuel III of Sardinia and Elisabeth Therese of Lorraine.

References

18th-century Italian painters
Italian male painters
18th-century Italian architects
18th-century Italian male artists